Variable pricing is a pricing strategy for products. Traditional examples include auctions, stock markets, foreign exchange markets, bargaining, electricity, and discounts. More recent examples, driven in part by reduced transaction costs using modern information technology, include yield management and some forms of congestion pricing. Increasingly, sport venues, such as AT&T Park in San Francisco, have employed variable pricing to capture the most revenue possible out of consumers and fans.

Discussion
Due to advances in technology, another variant of variable pricing, called "real-time pricing", has arisen. In some markets events occur so fast that there is insufficient time to either set a fixed price or engage in lengthy negotiations. By the time one has all the information to determine a price, everything has changed. Examples include airline tickets, stock markets, and foreign exchange markets. In each case prices can change in less than a second. By linking all the market participants through internet connections, price changes are disseminated instantly as they occur. 

A variant of real time pricing is online auction business model (such as eBay). All participants can view the price changes soon after they occur (technically this is not quite real time pricing because there is a delay built into the eBay system). Traditional auctions are inefficient because they require bidders (or their representatives) to be physically present. By solving this problem, online auctions reduce the transaction costs for bidders, increase the number of bidders, and increase the average bid price.

Sales are a traditional example of discriminatory pricing. During the Christmas shopping season prices are high. Come the new year there are sales. Other examples of sales occur on various goods such as appliances and cars. Electronics, clothes washers/dryers, etc. typically have a season of the year where sales occur. Cars are sold at discounts before the new model year. Discriminatory pricing is not always bad. It helps people who will/cannot pay "list" or even street price an opportunity to buy at a better price if they are willing to wait and/or to buy older models. At the same time it helps merchants clear out old stock and/or items for which they misjudged the market.

This kind of price discrimination is largely and widely used by rental car companies. Usually those firms need to know their customers' country of residence so they can adjust the price. Depending on the answer it is possible to get significantly different quotes for the same vehicle, date and time of rental. It is also true when accessing the rental car site through the .com main site.

Electricity real-time pricing allows charging higher prices when demand is highest, which is expected to reduce actual use during peak demand periods, which increases production costs because it drives the expansion of costly equipment.

See also
 e-marketing
 Geo (marketing)
 Marketing
 Price discrimination
 Pricing

References

 Maglaras, C., Meissner, J. "Dynamic Pricing Strategies for Multi-Product Revenue Management Problems." MSOM 2006.

Pricing
Management cybernetics